
Gmina Sochocin is a rural gmina (administrative district) in Płońsk County, Masovian Voivodeship, in east-central Poland.

Villages
Gmina Sochocin contains the villages and settlements of Baraki, Biele, Bolęcin, Budy Gutarzewskie, Ciemniewo, Drożdżyn, Gromadzyn, Gutarzewo, Idzikowice, Jędrzejewo, Kępa, Koliszewo, Kolonia Sochocin, Kołoząb, Kondrajec, Kuchary Królewskie, Kuchary Żydowskie, Milewo, Niewikla, Podsmardzewo, Rzy, Ślepowrony, Smardzewo, Sochocin, Wierzbówiec, Wycinki and Żelechy.

Neighbouring gminas
Gmina Sochocin is bordered by the gminas of Baboszewo, Glinojeck, Joniec, Nowe Miasto, Ojrzeń, Płońsk and Sońsk.

References

Polish official population figures 2006

Sochocin
Płońsk County